"I.F.L.Y." (I Fucking Love You) is a song by American singer Bazzi, released as a single on July 18, 2019 as the third and final single from his debut mixtape Soul Searching. The song reached the top 50 in Australia and New Zealand.

Charts

Certifications

References

2019 singles
2019 songs
Bazzi (singer) songs
Songs written by Bazzi (singer)